Khaled Naghaway (born 4 February 1968) is a Jordanian sports shooter. He competed in the mixed skeet event at the 1992 Summer Olympics.

References

1968 births
Living people
Jordanian male sport shooters
Olympic shooters of Jordan
Shooters at the 1992 Summer Olympics
Place of birth missing (living people)
20th-century Jordanian people